This is a list of products that were published by the game company Judges Guild.

Board games
Laser Tank

Role-playing game adventures and supplements

DragonQuest
Starsilver Trek

Empire of the Petal Throne
The Nightmare Maze of Jigrésh

Fantasy role-playing game adventures
The Caverns of Thracia
Caves and Caverns
Citadel of Fire
Dark Tower
The Dragon Crown
Escape from Astigar's Lair
F'Dech Fo's Tomb
GenCon IX Dungeon
Glory Hole Dwarven Mine
Heroic Expeditions
House on Hangman's Hill
The Illhiedrin Book
Inferno
Lara's Tower
The Maltese Clue
Modron
Of Skulls and Scrapfaggot Green
Operation Ogre
Ravenscrag
Restormel
Survival of the Fittest
Sword of Hope
Tegel Manor
Temple of Ra Accursed by Set
The Thieves of Fortress Badabaskor
The Tower of Indomitable Circumstance
Tower of Ulission
The Treasure Vaults of Lindoran
Trial by Fire
Under the Storm Giant's Castle
Zienteck

Fantasy role-playing game supplements
The Book of Ruins
The Book of Treasure Maps
The Book of Treasure Maps II
Campaign Hexagon System
Castle Book I
Castle Book II
Character Chronicle Cards
Character Codex
City State of the Invincible Overlord
City State of the World Emperor
Dragon's Hall
Dungeon Tac Cards
Fantastic Personalities
Fantastic Wilderlands Beyonde
The Fantasy Cartographer's Field Book
The First Fantasy Campaign
Frontier Forts of Kelnore
Judge's Shield
Masters of Mind
The Mines of Custalcon
Portals of Irontooth
Portals of Torsh
Portals of Twilight
Ready Ref Sheets
Spies of Lightelf
Temple Book I
Treasury of Archaic Names
The Unknown Gods
Verbosh
Village Book 1
Village Book 2
Wilderlands Hex Sheets
Wilderlands of High Fantasy
Wilderlands of the Fantastic Reaches
Wilderlands of the Magic Realm
World Map Set
Wraith Overlord: Terror Beneath the City State

RuneQuest adventures
Broken Tree Inn
City of Lei Tabor
Duck Pond
Hellpits of Nightfang
Legendary Duck Tower

Science fiction role-playing supplements
Port O' Call: Tarlkin's Landing

Superhero: 2044
Hazard

Traveller adventures
Amycus Probe
Corsairs of the Turku Waste
Darkling Ship
Darthanon Queen
Dra'k'ne Station
Marooned on Ghostring
Rogue Moon of Spinstorme
Simba Safari
Tancred

Traveller supplements
The Astrogators Chartbook
Crucis Margin
Fifty Starbases
Glimmerdrift Reaches
Ley Sector
Maranantha-Alkahest Sector
Navigator's Starcharts
Starships & Spacecraft
The Traveller Logbook
Traveller Referee Screen
Waspwinter

Tunnels & Trolls
The Toughest Dungeon in the World

Villains and Vigilantes
Break In At Three Kilometer Island

Magazines
Pegasus

Video games
Trek-80

References

 
Judges